The Assam earthquake of 1897 occurred on 12 June 1897, in Assam, British India at 11:06 UTC, and had an estimated moment magnitude of 8.2–8.3. It resulted in approximate 1,542 human casualties and caused catastrophic damage to infrastructures. Damage from the earthquake extended into Calcutta, where dozens of buildings were severely damaged, with some buildings partially collapsing. Trembles were felt across India, reaching as far as Ahmedabad and Peshawar. Seiches were also observed in Burma.

Earthquake
The earthquake occurred on the south–southwest-dipping reverse Oldham Fault that forms the northern edge of the Shillong Plateau. There was a minimum displacement on the main fault of 11 m, although some calculations have placed this figure at as high as 16 m; one of the greatest for any measured earthquake. The calculated area of slip extended 180 km along the strike and from 9–45 km beneath the surface, indicating that the entire thickness of the crust was involved.

Damage

Thought to have happened 32 km beneath the surface, the earthquake left masonry buildings in ruins over 400,000 km2 area and was felt over 650,000 km2 from Burma to Delhi. Numerous buildings in the neighboring country of Bhutan were heavily damaged. Dozens of aftershocks were felt in and around the region with the last event being felt on 9 October 1897 at 01:40 UT in Calcutta.

The earthquake resulted in Shillong Plateau being thrust violently upwards by about 11 meters. The fault was about 110 km in length while the fault slip was about 18 m (accuracy more or less by 7 m). At the epicenter, vertical acceleration is thought to have been greater than 1g and the surface velocity estimated at 3 m/s.

In Shillong, the earthquake damaged every stone house and half the houses built of wood. The shock leveled the ground and resulted in 13 deaths. The fissure was also reported in the area. In Sohra Cherrapunji, it resulted in a landslide, which led to 600 deaths. In Goalpara, it resulted in waves from the Brahmaputra River, on which bank the town is situated on, destroying the market. In  Nalbari, there were reported sightings of earth-waves and water waves. In Guwahati, the earthquake lasted for 3 minutes. the Brahmaputra river rose by 7.6  ft. Damage was caused to Umananda Island temple and railway lines, where five people died. In Nagaon, every brick house was damaged, while traditional houses made of wood, with grass roofs, were bent. There were many small fissures/volcanos and the road was impassable for vehicles.

In the Sylhet region, shocks took place at 16:30 local time, according to villagers living at the foot of the hills north of Sunamganj. There were 545 casualties; 55 in Sylhet town; 178 in North Sylhet; 287 in Sunamganj; seven in Habiganj; eight in South Sylhet and 10 in Karimganj. Many building collapse, fissures and drownings furthered the number of deaths. A woman in Sunamganj is said to have fell through a fissure whilst on a river with her husband. The husband tried to hold onto her hair but lost hold of her. The woman's body was not recovered from the crevasse. The Assam Bengal Railway was severely damaged.

Richard Dixon Oldham, the Superintendent of the Geological Survey of India, analysed seismic records of the earthquake, mainly from stations in Italy, and reported the first clear evidence of different type of seismic waves, travelling through the earth on different paths and at different speeds.

See also
1905 Kangra earthquake
List of earthquakes in India
List of historical earthquakes

References

Further reading

External links

 Tom LaTouche and the Great Assam Earthquake of 12 June 1897: Letters from the Epicenter (with photographs of damage at Shillong, Rowmari and Calcutta, detailed field report with diagrams, and mapping of the epicentre)

1897 Assam
1897 earthquakes
1897 in India
1897
June 1897 events
Disasters in Assam
1897 disasters in India